Arvo Kinnari (born 13 September 1943) is a Finnish biathlete. He competed in the 20 km individual event at the 1968 Winter Olympics.

References

External links
 

1943 births
Living people
Finnish male biathletes
Olympic biathletes of Finland
Biathletes at the 1968 Winter Olympics
Sportspeople from Leningrad Oblast